Jerris Cornelius McPhail (born June 26, 1976) is a former professional American football running back who played in the National Football League (NFL) for three seasons for the Miami Dolphins and Detroit Lions. McPhail was drafted by the Dolphins in the fifth round with the 134th overall pick in the 1996 NFL Draft. 

1972 births
Living people
People from Clinton, North Carolina
Players of American football from North Carolina
American football running backs
East Carolina Pirates football players
Miami Dolphins players
Detroit Lions players